The 2024 Michigan Republican presidential primary is set to be held on February 27, 2024, as part of the Republican Party primaries for the 2024 presidential election. 55 delegates to the 2024 Republican National Convention will be allocated on a winner-take-most basis.

Background 
In the 2016 Michigan Republican presidential primary, Donald Trump won with 36.5% of the vote, carrying 25 out of 59 delegates total. His closest opponents, Governor of Ohio John Kasich and Senator from Texas Ted Cruz, received 24.9% and 24.3% of the vote, respectively, with both candidates receiving 17 delegates.

Schedule 
In February 2023, Governor Gretchen Whitmer signed legislation to move up the date of both the Democratic and Republican presidential primaries in Michigan to February 27, 2024, in line with the Democratic National Committee's (DNC) state reorganization plan.

Candidates

Declared candidates 
Former president Donald Trump and former South Carolina Governor and U.S. Ambassador to the United Nations Nikki Haley are the only main contenders to officially announce their candidacy so far.

Potential candidates 
Florida governor Ron DeSantis is widely expected to announce his candidacy as soon as May 2023. Former Indiana governor and vice president Mike Pence is reportedly considering running for the Republican Presidential Nomination.  

Other Republicans thought to be considering contending for the GOP nomination are South Carolina Senator Tim Scott, former New Jersey Governor Chris Christie, former Arkansas Governor Asa Hutchinson, former Maryland governor Larry Hogan, former United States Secretary of State Mike Pompeo, current governors Glenn Youngkin of Virginia and Kristi Noem of South Dakota.

Other candidates 
Detroit-based businessman Perry Johnson, who unsuccessfully ran in the Republican primary for Governor of Michigan in the 2022 election, has launched a presidential candidacy. Described as a "long-shot" candidate, Johnson spent $192,000 on a campaign ad at Super Bowl LVII.

Endorsements

Polling

See also 
 2024 Republican Party presidential primaries
 2024 United States presidential election
 2024 United States presidential election in Michigan
 2024 United States elections

Notes

References 

Michigan Republican primaries
Republican presidential primary
Michigan